The 2022 Swedish speedway season was the 2022 season of speedway in Sweden.

In March 2022, Vetlanda were declared bankrupt and would not compete during the season.

Individual

Swedish Individual Speedway Championship

Swedish U21 Championship

Team
Smederna won the Elitserien and were declared the winners of the Swedish Speedway Team Championship. Valsarna won the Allsvenskan (second tier league).

Elitserien
Clubs

Quarter-finals

Semi-finals

Final

Allsvenskan (second tier league)
Clubs

+ Smålänningarna failed to fulfil their final fixture and were fined 25,000 kronor and deducted 4 pts

Semi-finals

Final

Swedish Division One (third tier league)

See also 
 Speedway in Sweden

References

Speedway leagues
Professional sports leagues in Sweden
Swedish
speedway
Seasons in Swedish speedway